The 2010–11 season was Juventus Football Club's 113th in existence and fourth consecutive season in the top-flight of Italian football. Juventus started the season with a new chairman, Andrea Agnelli and a new coach, Luigi Delneri. This was the last season that Juventus were trophyless, as for a decade, they did nine in a row and won the coppa italia

Club

Coaching staff

Medical staff

Management

Sport department

Other information

Kit
The kits for the 2010–11 season were revealed on 2 July 2010 bearing the BetClic logo. The home kit is traditional white and black stripes reinterpreted by Nike through a zigzag motif. The same motif is also present on the away kit, which has two green and red stripes on white background imitating flag of Italy. In October 2010 Balocco became the official sponsor for the away jersey in league matches. The previous season away kit is used as third kit.

Players

Squad information

UEFA Europa League squad

Transfers

In

Total spending:  €59.35 million

Out

Total income:   €41.675 million.

Pre-season and friendlies

Competitions

Serie A

League table

Results summary

Results by round

Matches

Coppa Italia

UEFA Europa League

Third qualifying round

Play-off round

Group stage

Statistics

{|class="wikitable" style="text-align: center;"
|-
!
! Total
! Home
! Away
|-
|align=left| Games played || 50 || 26 || 24
|-
|align=left| Games won    || 20 || 11 || 9
|-
|align=left| Games drawn  || 19 || 9 || 10
|-
|align=left| Games lost   || 11 || 6 || 5
|-
|align=left| Biggest win  || 4–0 vs Udinese4–0 vs Lecce || 4–0 vs Lecce || 4–0 vs Udinese
|-
|align=left| Biggest loss || 1–4 vs Parma0–3 vs Napoli || 1–4 vs Parma || 0–3 vs Napoli
|-
|align=left| Biggest win (League) || 4–0 vs Udinese4–0 vs Lecce || 4–0 vs Lecce || 4–0 vs Udinese
|-
|align=left| Biggest win (Cup) || 2-0 vs Catania || 2-0 vs Catania || None
|-
|align=left| Biggest win (Europe) || 2–0 vs Shamrock Rovers || 1–0 vs Shamrock Rovers  1–0 Sturm Graz || 2–0 vs Shamrock Rovers
|-
|align=left| Biggest loss (League) || 1–4 vs Parma0–3 vs Napoli || 1–4 vs Parma  || 0–3 vs Napoli
|-
|align=left| Biggest loss (Cup) || 0–2 vs Roma || 0–2 vs Roma || None
|-
|align=left| Biggest loss (Europe) || None || None || None 
|-
|align=left| Clean sheets || 15 || 6 || 9
|-
|align=left| Goals scored || 72 || 43 || 29 
|-
|align=left| Goals conceded || 57 || 37 || 20
|-
|align=left| Goal difference || +15 || +6 || +9 
|-
|-
|-
|align=left| Yellow cards || 90 || 40 || 50 
|-
|align=left| Red cards || 5 || 2 || 3 
|-
|align=left| Most appearances ||align=left| Alessandro Del Piero (44)||align=left| Alessandro Del Piero (24) Simone Pepe (24)||align=left| Leonardo Bonucci (22)
|-
|align=left| Top scorer ||align=left| Alessandro Del Piero (11) ||align=left| Alessandro Del Piero (10) ||align=left| Fabio Quagliarella (6)
|-
|align=left |Worst discipline ||align=left| Claudio Marchisio 13 ||align=left| Mohamed Sissoko 6  Claudio Marchisio 6  Felipe Melo 5  1 ||align=left| Claudio Marchisio 7  Simone Pepe 7 
|-
|align=left|Penalties for || 4/5 (%) || 4/4 (%) || 0/1 (%)
|-
|align=left|Penalties against || 4/5 (%) || 2/2 (%) || 2/3 (%)
|-
|align=left| Points (League) || 58/114 (%) || 30/57 (%) || 28/57 (%) 
|-
|align=left| Winning rate|| % || % || % 
|-

Appearances and goals

Notes

References

Juventus F.C. seasons
Juventus
Juventus